Ana Maria Cuervo (born 14 July 1966) is a Spanish-American physician, researcher, and cell biologist. She is a Professor in Developmental and Molecular Biology, Anatomy and Structural Biology, and Medicine and co-director of the Institute for Aging Studies at the Albert Einstein College of Medicine. She is best known for her research work on autophagy, the process by which cells recycle waste products, and its changes in aging and age-related diseases.

Biography
Cuervo was born in Barcelona, Spain on 14 July 1966. She studied medicine at the University of Valencia in 1986 and further pursued a PhD in biochemistry and molecular biology under the mentorship of Erwin Knecht, a biochemist studying lysosomes and proteosome at the time. In 1993, she published her first academic paper as a co-author on lysosomal degradation which challenged the assumption that it was non-specific. Cuervo also worked with Fred “Paulo” Dice of Tufts University on lysosomes during the summer months as Spanish labs were closed during this time of year. Cuervo later accepted a full-time post-doctorate position at Dice's laboratory and focused on understanding the lysosomal degradation pathway. In 1996 and 2000, Cuervo and Dice published their findings on this pathway, identified the lysosomal membrane protein LAMP2A as the receptor for this form of autophagy and termed it chaperone-mediated autophagy.

In October 2001, Cuervo accepted a faculty position at the Albert Einstein College of Medicine in The Bronx, New York. She continue primarily focusing on chaperone-mediated autophagy and its role in aging and human disease. Her research lab focused on protein translocations across lysosomal membranes, identifying regulator proteins like glial fibrillary acidic protein. In collaboration with neuroscientist David Sulzer of Columbia University Medical Center, she published evidence of altered chaperone-mediated autophagy in Parkinson's disease. Similar findings of disrupted autophagy was also reported when Huntington Disease was studied. Cuervo's research team also identified LRRK2, a protein enzyme that becomes mutated in Parkinson's disease, disrupts the process of translocation across lysosomal membranes.

She is also co-director of the Einstein Institute for Aging Research and a member of the Einstein Liver Research Center and Cancer Center. She is also the Robert and Renée Belfer Chair for the Study of Neurodegenerative Diseases at Albert Einstein College of Medicine. In 2015 she was elected International Academic of the Royal Academy of Medicine of the Valencia Community and in 2017, member of the Real Academia de Ciencias Exactas, Fisicas y Naturales. In 2018, Cuervo was elected a member of the American Academy of Arts and Sciences.

She has also served as a member of the  National Institute on Aging (NIA) Scientific Council, NIH Scientific Council of Councils, NIA Board of Scientific Counselors and in the Advisory Committee to the NIH Deputy Director. Dr. Cuervo is also one of the founding members of the Women in Autophagy (WIA) network dedicate to promote careers of young scientist interested in autophagy.

Cuervo is co-editor-in-chief of the Aging Cell journal and serves in the editorial board of Cell Metabolism and Molecular Cell. She has been involved in more than 200 publications. Dr. Cuervo has been included in the 2018, 2019, 2020 Highly Cited Researchers List (ranking of top 1% cited researchers).

Recognition
Cuervo and her team have received numerous awards including the P. Benson Award, Keith Porter Fellow, Nathan Shock Memorial Award, Vincent Cristofalo Award in Aging, Bennett J. Cohen, Marshall Horwitz Prize and the Saul Korey Prize in Translational Medicine. She has delivered prominent lectures such as the Robert R. Konh, the NIH Director’s, the Roy Walford, the Feodor Lynen, the Margaret Pittman, the IUBMB, the David H. Murdoxk, the Gerry Aurbach  and the SEBBM L’Oreal-UNESCO for Women in Science, and the Harvey Lecture. She also received twice the LaDonne Schulman Teaching Award . She was elected to the National Academy of Sciences in 2019.

Personal life
Cuervo speaks Spanish, and English.  Cuervo's husband is Dr. Fernando Macian, an immunologist at Albert Einstein College of Medicine.

References

1966 births
Living people
Spanish women physicians
Spanish biochemists
Women molecular biologists
Scientists from Catalonia
Spanish women chemists
Spanish emigrants to the United States
American women biochemists
American women chemists
Members of the United States National Academy of Sciences
21st-century American women